Tsapalovka is a rural locality (a village) in Belsky Selsoviet, Gafuriysky District, Bashkortostan, Russia. The population was 29 as of 2010. There is 1 street.

Geography 
Tsapalovka is located 15 km west of Krasnousolsky (the district's administrative centre) by road. Inzelga is the nearest rural locality.

References 

Rural localities in Gafuriysky District